West River Sheet Harbour (locally known as West River) is a river on the Eastern Shore of Nova Scotia, Canada, in the Halifax Regional Municipality. Its headwaters are near the Musquodoboit Valley and the river flows southeast and empties in to the Northwest Arm of Sheet Harbour, Nova Scotia. The river has three main tributaries: West River Main, Killag River and Little River. The river was suffering from acidification, so a lime doser was installed and has been in use since September 2005. It stabilized the river's pH at 5.5, a healthy level for aquatic life.

Geography
The West River system, along with the East River watershed system, comprise a total area of 988 km2. The West River system has three main tributaries: West River, Killag River and Little River.

West River is the main tributary of the West River system. The river is prone to flash-flooding. There are two lake-like pools on the river. The first and more southerly one is Sheet Harbour Lake, which has an area of 1.2 km2 and is located near the West River Falls in Sheet Harbour. The other lake is Little Lake, which is more inland in the system and has an area of 0.5 km2. Killag River and Little River both discharge in to the Main West River. Killag River begins at West Lake and Little River flows from Lake Alma. West River then flows through Sheet Harbour Lake, then down the West River Falls and discharges in to the Northwest Arm of Sheet Harbour.

Killag River is a secondary tributary of the West River system. Most of the salmon in the river system breed on the Killag River. Killag River discharges in to West River. Little River is the other secondary tributary of the river system. Little River discharges in to West River.

History
In 1922, a ground-wood pulp mill, owned by the American Pulp and Wrapping Paper Co. of Albany, began operation on the West River Falls. They had purchased it from Rhodes and Currie, the previous owners who were a lumber company. It produced its first ground-wood pulp on October 5, 1925. It remained in operation until it was destroyed by Hurricane Beth in August 1971.

West River has been dosed with a lime doser since September 2005. Sheet Harbour was the first community in North America to equip a lime doser on one of its rivers. It was the result of the worsening salmon population in Atlantic Canada rivers, which is being caused be acid rain and low pH levels. It was successful in stabilizing the pH of the river at 5.5, which is a healthy level for salmon and other water life.

References

Notes

Bibliography

External links
Assessment of the 2009 West River, Sheet Harbour Atlantic salmon smolt migration
Sheet Harbour Chamber of Commerce Website

Landforms of Halifax, Nova Scotia
Rivers of Nova Scotia